is a passenger railway station located in the city of Sagamihara, Kanagawa Prefecture, Japan, operated by the East Japan Railway Company (JR East).

Lines

Station layout
The station consists of a single side platform with an unattended station building.

History
Shimomizo Station was opened on April 29, 1931 as a station on the Sagami Railway. On June 1, 1944, the Sagami Railway was nationalized and merged with the Japan National Railways. Freight services were discontinued from October 1962. On April 1, 1987, with the dissolution and privatization of the Japan National Railways, the station came under the operation of JR East. Automated turnstiles using the Suica IC card system came into operation from November 2001.

Passenger statistics
In fiscal 2014, the station was used by an average of 1,134 passengers daily (boarding passengers only).

Surrounding area
Camp Zama

See also
List of railway stations in Japan

References

External links

Station information page 

Railway stations in Kanagawa Prefecture
Railway stations in Japan opened in 1931
Railway stations in Sagamihara
Sagami Line